Shōeisha Co., Ltd., sometimes abbreviated SE, is a publisher specializing in computer and software books. They have more than 1,000 publications, including programming books and application tutorials.

Formerly, Shōeisha produced video games for various consoles, including the PlayStation, Dreamcast, and Sega Saturn. Twenty-three such titles were released 1995 through 2001.

Video Game Releases

References

Shoeisha Co., Ltd. Homepage
IGN Profile
Plasticbad.de
Game Releases by Year

Amusement companies of Japan
Video game companies established in 1986
Publishing companies established in 1986
Book publishing companies in Tokyo
Software companies based in Tokyo
Video game companies of Japan
Video game publishers
Video game development companies
Japanese companies established in 1986